Mereswine may refer to:

Dolphins, aquatic mammals related to Porpoises and Whales
Porpoises, small Cetaceans of the family Phocoenidae

See also 
Delphinoidea, superfamily encompassing dolphins, porpoises and belugas.

Animal common name disambiguation pages